McKenty is a surname. Notable people with the surname include:

 Jacob Kerlin McKenty (1827–1866), American national politician
 Neil McKenty (born 1924), English-Canadian radio and television broadcaster and author
 Finn McKenty (born 1978), American marketing strategist and music commentator